Dorothea Maria of Saxe-Gotha-Altenburg (12 February 1654 in Gotha – 17 June 1682 in Gotha), was a German princess member of the House of Wettin in the Ernestine branch of Saxe-Gotha-Altenburg.

She was the twelfth child and fourth daughter of Ernest I, Duke of Saxe-Gotha by his wife Elisabeth Sophie, the only daughter of John Philip, Duke of Saxe-Altenburg.

Life
From her parents' eighteen children, only nine survived infancy. Dorothea Maria was the second surviving daughter by 1657, when four of her siblings died, three as a consequence of smallpox and one of natural causes aged two months of life. After the birth and death of her last sister in 1663, she remained as the youngest daughter of her family.

Little is known about her. Born Princess Dorothea Maria of Saxe-Gotha, after her mother's cousin death in 1672 Duke Ernest I inherited the Duchy of Saxe-Altenburg and assumed his arms and titles; since them, she was named Princess Dorothea Maria of Saxe-Gotha-Altenburg.

Dorothea Maria died in her native Gotha unmarried, aged twenty-eight. She was buried in the Schloss Friedenstein, Gotha.

References

1654 births
1682 deaths
People from Saxe-Gotha
Daughters of monarchs